Marudi is a town in the Malaysian state of Sarawak, and is a part of the division of Miri. Marudi was the administrative centre of the northern region of Sarawak before Miri was established. Marudi is considered as the cultural heart of the Orang Ulu, the highland tribes of Sarawak. It is also a transit gateway to Gunung Mulu National Park, a UNESCO World Heritage Site.

History 

Charles Brooke succeeded James Brooke as the new Rajah of Sarawak in 1868.

By 1883, the sultan of Brunei (Abdul Momin) ceded the Baram region (including Miri) to Charles Brooke.

The fourth division of Sarawak was immediately created with the installation of Mamerto George Gueritz as the first Resident of the Division.

A fort was built in at Marudi, 43 km to the east of Miri in 1883: it was named Claudetown in honour of Claude Champion de Crespigny, Resident of the Third Division when he died in 1884, and it became the administrative centre of the division.

The administration was helped by two junior officers, 30 rangers, and a few native police.

Charles Hose became Resident of Baram District in 1891 and the fort in Marudi was renamed Fort Hose.

In 1895 and 1896, the Brooke administration organized an expedition to Usun Apau Plieran to punish the Kenyah people (including the Badeng people, a sub-tribe of Kenyahs) living there, who were alleged to have been responsible for the deaths of a Malay, a Chinese trader, and several Iban people. In October 1896, Saba Irang, the headman of the Badeng people, came to Claudetown to seek refuge and make peace with the Brooke administration. Hose decided to organize a peace conference at his fort in April 1899 to “encourage the Madang (Badeng) to be loyal subjects and to ensure a friendly recognition by them by the Baram people". The conference was attended by 6,000 people.

This peace conference also led to creation of the Baram Regatta, a long boat race competition among the natives that continues to be held in the present day.

The Resident Office moved from Marudi to Miri in 1912 after oil was discovered in Miri.

Administration 
The town is the administrative centre of Marudi District, a district in the Miri Division of Sarawak.

Transportation

Air
Marudi is served by Marudi Airport (MUR) which is in the town. Twin Otters fly to Miri up to nine times daily and serve Bario, Long Banga, Long Lellang, Long Akah and Long Seridan. The airport is a 10-minute (1 km) walk east from the centre.

Water
Express boats between Marudi and Kuala Baram used to operate regularly in the morning and early afternoon until the road connecting Miri to Marudi was paved. The express boats service stopped operating June 1, 2015.

Geography

Climate
Marudi has a tropical rainforest climate with heavy to very heavy rainfall year-round.

Economy

Tourism

The main tourist attraction in the town is Fort Hose, a wooden fort built during the Brooke administration. The fort was named after Hose. The fort was later converted into a museum that houses some ethnographic photographs, local textiles, handicrafts, and ceremonial items.

See also

References

Marudi District
Towns in Sarawak